Anandamide (ANA), also known as N-arachidonoylethanolamine (AEA), is a fatty acid neurotransmitter. Anandamide was the first endocannabinoid to be discovered: it participates in the body's endocannabinoid system by binding to cannabinoid receptors, the same receptors that the psychoactive compound THC in cannabis acts on. Anandamide is found in nearly all tissues in a wide range of animals. Anandamide has also been found in plants, including small amounts in chocolate. The name 'anandamide' is taken from the Sanskrit word ananda, which means "joy, bliss, delight", plus amide.

Anandamide is derived from the non-oxidative metabolism of arachidonic acid, an essential omega-6 fatty acid. It is synthesized from N-arachidonoyl phosphatidylethanolamine by multiple pathways. It is degraded primarily by the fatty acid amide hydrolase (FAAH) enzyme, which converts anandamide into ethanolamine and arachidonic acid. As such, inhibitors of FAAH lead to elevated anandamide levels and are being pursued for therapeutic use.

Anandamide is also being explored for its role in diabetic neuropathy/neuropathy as well as in reduction of inflammation associated with renal injury.

Physiological functions 

Anandamide was first described (and named) in 1992 by Raphael Mechoulam and his lab members W. A. Devane and Lumír Hanuš.

Anandamide's effects can occur in either the central or peripheral nervous system. These distinct effects are mediated primarily by CB1 cannabinoid receptors in the central nervous system, and CB2 cannabinoid receptors in the periphery. The latter are mainly involved in functions of the immune system. Cannabinoid receptors were originally discovered as being sensitive to Δ9-tetrahydrocannabinol (Δ9-THC, commonly called THC), which is the primary psychoactive cannabinoid found in cannabis. The discovery of anandamide came from research into CB1 and CB2, as it was inevitable that a naturally occurring (endogenous) chemical would be found to affect these receptors.

Anandamide is also important for implantation of the early stage embryo in its blastocyst form into the uterus. Therefore, cannabinoids such as Δ9-THC might influence processes during the earliest stages of human pregnancy. Peak plasma anandamide occurs at ovulation and positively correlates with peak estradiol and gonadotrophin levels, suggesting that these may be involved in the regulation of anandamide levels. Subsequently, anandamide has been proposed as a biomarker of infertility, but so far lacks any predictive values in order to be used clinically.

The acute beneficial effects of exercise (termed as runner's high) seem to be mediated by anandamide in mice. Anandamide is the precursor of a class of physiologically active substances, the prostamides. Anandamide was found in 2007 to inhibit the proliferation of certain human breast cancer cell lines in vitro.

Anandamide is found in chocolate together with two substances that might mimic the effects of anandamide, N-oleoylethanolamine and N-linoleoylethanolamine.

Additionally, anandamide and other endocannabinoids are found in the model organism Drosophila melanogaster (fruit fly), although no CB receptors have been found in any insects.

Effects on behavior 
The role of the endocannabinoid system on behavior and mood is still being researched. Both the CB1 and CB2 receptors (the bonding site of anandamide) seem to play a role in the identification of positive and negative interpretation of environment and setting. In animal models, anandamide plays a role in the interpretation of stimulus; specifically, optimism and pessimism in the presence of an ambiguous cue. Anandamide has been shown to impair working memory in rats, while THC (the compound in cannabis that binds to the CB1 and CB2 receptors) also shows a deficit in working memory. Studies are under way to explore what role anandamide plays in human behavior, such as eating, sleep patterns, and pain relief.

This binding relationship of anandamide and the CB1/CB2 seems to play a role in neurotransmission of dopamine, serotonin, GABA, and glutamate. There is currently encouraging, albeit embryonic, evidence for medicinal cannabis in the treatment of a range of psychiatric disorders. Supportive findings are emerging for some key isolates, however, clinicians need to be mindful of a range of prescriptive and occupational safety considerations, especially if initiating higher dose THC formulas..

Anandamide injected directly into the forebrain reward-related brain structure nucleus accumbens enhances the pleasurable responses of rats to a rewarding sucrose taste, and enhances food intake as well. Increasing anandamide seems to increase the intrinsic value of food, not necessarily by stimulation of appetite or hunger.

Although more scientific information is needed, by comparing the effect of THC/anandamide, it can be inferred that anandamide plays a role in hunger, sleep, pain modulation, working memory, identification of novelty, and interpretation of environment.

Synthesis and degradation 
In humans, anandamide is biosynthesized from N-arachidonoyl phosphatidylethanolamine (NAPE). In turn NAPE arises by transfer of arachidonic acid from lecithin to the free amine of cephalin through an N-acyltransferase enzyme. Anandamide synthesis from NAPE occurs via multiple pathways and includes enzymes such as phospholipase A2, phospholipase C and N-acetylphosphatidylethanolamine-hydrolysing phospholipase D (NAPE-PLD).

The crystal structure of NAPE-PLD in complex with phosphatidylethanolamine and deoxycholate shows how the cannabinoid anandamide is generated from membrane N-acylphosphatidylethanolamines (NAPEs), and reveals that bile acids – which are mainly involved in the absorption of lipids in the small intestine – modulate its biogenesis.

Endogenous anandamide is present at very low levels and has a very short half-life due to the action of the enzyme fatty acid amide hydrolase (FAAH), which breaks it down into free arachidonic acid and ethanolamine. Studies of piglets show that dietary levels of arachidonic acid and other essential fatty acids affect the levels of anandamide and other endocannabinoids in the brain. High fat diet feeding in mice increases levels of anandamide in the liver and increases lipogenesis. This suggests that anandamide may play a role in the development of obesity, at least in rodents.

Paracetamol (called acetaminophen in the US and Canada) is metabolically combined with arachidonic acid by FAAH to form AM404. This metabolite of paracetamol is a potent agonist at the TRPV1 vanilloid receptor, a weak agonist at both CB1 and CB2 receptors, and an inhibitor of anandamide reuptake. As a result, anandamide levels in the body and brain are elevated. In this fashion, paracetamol acts as a pro-drug for a cannabimimetic metabolite. This action may be partially or fully responsible for the analgesic effects of paracetamol.

Endocannabinoid transporters for anandamide and 2-arachidonoylglycerol include the heat shock proteins (Hsp70s) and fatty acid binding proteins (FABPs).

It is found that anandamide prefer cholesterol and ceramide more than other membrane lipids, and cholesterol can behave as a binding partner for it, and following an initial interaction mediated by the establishment of a hydrogen bond, the endocannabinoid is attracted towards the membrane interior, where it forms a molecular complex with cholesterol after a functional conformation adaptation to the apolar membrane milieu, and from there, the complex is further directed to the cannabinoid receptor (CB1) and out.

Research and production
Black pepper contains the alkaloid guineesine, which is an anandamide reuptake inhibitor. It may therefore increase anandamide's physiological effects.

Low dose intake of anandamide has an anxiolytic effect, but high dose intake injected directly into the cerebral fluid of the brain of mice shows evident cell apoptosis (programmed cell death) in vitro as opposed to necrosis. Although this is contradicted by another study also done in both in vitro and in vivo showing neuron growth in the same situation.

Research has suggested that Endocannabinoids disturb homeostasis in the body in several ways, either by encouraging hunger sensations and food intake and by shifting energy balance in the body towards energy storage. A resultant decrease in energy expenditure was also observed. 

Another study with rats expressed that reductions in AEA signaling through FAAH overexpression within the basolateral complex of amygdala (BLA) appeared to reliably reduce measurements of anxiety and overall levels of corticosterone, a primary glucocorticoid in animals like birds, rodents, reptiles and amphibians responsible for energy regulation, immune and stress responses. This is similar to the main glucocorticoid cortisol in humans. Reduction of AEA in the BLA has been shown to suppress fear behavior as well as promote fear extinction. This suggests possible involvement of AEA intervention in the future for the treatment of psychological disorders. However, further work in this area of study is needed to strengthen this belief, as reduced anandamide signaling is believed at this moment to involve CB1 receptors as well as GABAergic and glutamatergic interactions.

Cortical glutamatergic transmission may be modulated by endocannabinoids during stress and fear habituation. Glutamatergic interaction in the BLA believed to be responsible for changes in anxiety, appears to normalize stress-induced anxiety-like behavior. A current study indicated that infusion of the GluK1 receptor agonist, ATPA, into the BLA enhanced GABAergic neurotransmission, which is currently believed to have a large role in the reduction of anxiety symptoms.

Additionally, the ECs along with AEA has been highlighted for its potential involvement in obesity development and harmful effects on lipid and glucose metabolism, which may contribute to insulin resistance and deficiency, both of which are a large risk factor for developing Type 2 Diabetes. Blockade of CB1 receptors was found significantly to improve lipid resistance and lipid profile in obese subjects, but also has potential to increase fat accumulation through increased food intake, favored lipogenesis and reduced energy expenditure. This may also affect distant systems like the pancreas, liver, adipose tissue and skeletal muscle, with inflammation and apoptosis in the case of the pancreas. CB1R inhibition with peripherally restricted antagonists/inverse agonists may aid in the treatment of diabetic neuropathy and neuropathy. CB2R agonists may also show promise for the treatment of inflammation, which contributes to renal injury.

AEA was associated with nonalcoholic fatty liver disease, or NAFLD, severity, presence of nonalcoholic steatohepatitis(NASH), and fibrosis. Data suggests AEA as a marker for cardiometabolic disease and NAFLD severity. NAFLD can progress to more severe diseases, like NASH, cirrhosis, and hepatocellular carcinoma.

A Scottish woman with a rare genetic mutation in her FAAH gene with resultant elevated anandamide levels was reported to be immune to anxiety, unable to experience fear and insensitive to pain. The frequent burns and cuts she suffered due to her hypoalgesia healed more rapidly than was expected.

See also 
 Virodhamine

References

External links 

 Could anandamide be the missing link to "runner's high"? Accessed 2015-10-31
 

Endocannabinoids
Neurotransmitters
Fatty acid amides
Biomolecules
Primary alcohols
CB1 receptor agonists
CB2 receptor agonists
Glycine receptor agonists
Glycine receptor antagonists
Euphoriants
Arachidonyl compounds